The Eleven Devils (German: Die elf Teufel) is a 1927 German silent sports film directed by Zoltan Korda and Carl Boese and starring Gustav Fröhlich, Evelyn Holt and Lissy Arna.

The film's art director was Max Knaake.

Cast
Gustav Fröhlich as Tommy, the centre-forward 
Evelyn Holt as Linda  
Lissy Arna as Vivien  
Fritz Alberti as Lauren, coach 
John Mylong as Biller, opposing centre-forward  
Willi Forst as assistant coach
Harry Nestor as Der Kellner  
Geza L. Weiss as boy

References

External links

Films of the Weimar Republic
Films directed by Carl Boese
Films directed by Zoltán Korda
German silent feature films
German association football films
National Film films
German black-and-white films
1920s sports films
German sports films
1920s German films
Silent sports films